Grand Meadow is a city in Mower County, Minnesota, United States. The city is on the boundary between Grand Meadow Township and Frankford Township, and it is politically independent of both townships.  The population was 1,139 at the 2010 census.

Geography

Climate

Transportation
The city is located at the intersection of Mower County road 8 and Minnesota State Highway 16. The city was served by the Milwaukee Road railroad until the late 1970s.

Parks
Parks in the city are:
Pine Lawn, located east of town on State Highway 16.
City Park, located on 1st Avenue SE.
Veterans Memorial Park, located on the site of the old Grand Meadow school.

Demographics

2010 census
As of the census of 2010, there were 1,139 people, 454 households, and 287 families residing in the city. The racial makeup of the city was 96.7% White, 1.4% African American, 0.1% Native American, 0.5% Asian, 0.7% from other races, and 0.6% from two or more races. Hispanic or Latino of any race were 2.2% of the population.

There were 454 households, of which 36.6% had children under the age of 18 living with them, 47.6% were married couples living together, 11.9% had a female householder with no husband present, 3.7% had a male householder with no wife present, and 36.8% were non-families. 33.5% of all households were made up of individuals, and 17.7% had someone living alone who was 65 years of age or older. The average household size was 2.43 and the average family size was 3.11.

The median age in the city was 36.3 years. 29% of residents were under the age of 18; 5.8% were between the ages of 18 and 24; 26.2% were from 25 to 44; 21.6% were from 45 to 64; and 17.2% were 65 years of age or older. The gender makeup of the city was 47.2% male and 52.8% female.

2000 census
As of the census of 2000, there were 945 people, 395 households, and 233 families residing in the city. The racial makeup of the city was 98.73% White, 0.21% Native American, 0.11% Asian, 0.63% from other races, and 0.32% from two or more races. Hispanic or Latino of any race were 0.63% of the population.

There were 395 households, out of which 28.4% had children under the age of 18 living with them, 49.1% were married couples living together, 7.3% had a female householder with no husband present, and 40.8% were non-families. 35.2% of all households were made up of individuals, and 16.5% had someone living alone who was 65 years of age or older.  The average household size was 2.29 and the average family size was 3.04.

In the city, the population was spread out, with 24.4% under the age of 18, 8.7% from 18 to 24, 28.0% from 25 to 44, 18.9% from 45 to 64, and 19.9% who were 65 years of age or older.  The median age was 37 years. For every 100 females, there were 87.5 males.  For every 100 females age 18 and over, there were 78.9 males.

The median income for a household in the city was $38,188, and the median income for a family was $46,667. Males had a median income of $29,427 versus $23,333 for females. The per capita income for the city was $18,509.  About 5.9% of families and 4.8% of the population were below the poverty line, including 5.3% of those under age 18 and 4.6% of those age 65 or over.

History
Grand Meadow was platted in 1870, and named for the prairies near the original town site.

Landmarks

Grand Meadow Public School
This is currently the largest monolithic dome school in Minnesota.  It houses the K-12 grades from Grand Meadow in five separate domes. The domes are lettered A, B, C, D and E.  Dome A is the secondary dome, which has the junior and senior high.  Dome B is the administrative dome with the elementary and high school offices and media center.  Dome C is the elementary dome with grades Pre-K through 6th grade.  Dome D, the athletics dome, has the gymnasium, wrestling room and weight room.  The arts dome is Dome E with the band room and art room and also the cafetorium. On the outside there are two purple stripes going around each dome.

Grand Army of the Republic (G.A.R.) Hall--Booth Post No. 130

Booth Post No. 130 was once a meeting hall for members of the Grand Army of the Republic. The hall is apparently one of only two remaining in Minnesota and is located on West side of South Main Street between First Avenue SW and Second Avenue SW. The building is on the National Register of Historic Places because of its architectural and social significance.

References

Further reading

External links
City of Grand Meadow website
Grand Meadow School website

Cities in Mower County, Minnesota